Verkiai Calvary or Vilnius Calvary is the second oldest calvary in Lithuania after Žemaičių Kalvarija. It is located in Verkiai, a neighborhood of Vilnius, capital of Lithuania. The calvary was built in 1662–69 as a sign of gratitude for the victory in the Second Northern War (1655–60). The calvary includes 20 brick chapels, seven wooden and one brick gate, and one bridge with a wooden chapel. The path ends at the Church of the Discovery of the Holy Cross. In 1962 all chapels, except four closest to the church, were destroyed by the Soviet authorities. The calvary was reconstructed in 1990–2002.

Stations
The calvary has 35 stations:
 The Last Supper
 On the Way to the Mount of Olives
 In the garden of Gethsemane
 Arrest of Jesus
 Crossing the Kidron Valley 
 Disciples flee Jesus before the Gate of the Town
 At the First Gate of Zion
 Jesus taken to Annas
 At the High Priest Caiaphas
 Jesus imprisoned in the basement of Caiaphas' Palace 
 The second time at Caiaphas
 At the Second Gate of Zion
 Jesus before Pilate for the first time
 The first time at the Iron Gate
 Jesus at Herod's court
 Jesus ridiculed by Herod for the second time at the Iron Gate
 Jesus taken to Pilate through the Second Town Gate
 At the Second Town Gate Jesus found worthier of death than the rebel Barabbas
 Jesus flogged at the Gate of the Town Hall
 At the Fourth Gate of the Old Town
 Jesus sentenced to be crucified
 Jesus takes his Cross
 Jesus falls for the first time
 Jesus meets his mother Mary
 Simon of Cyrene helps Christ carry the Cross
 Veronica wipes Christ's face with her veil
 Jesus falls for the second time
 Jesus meets the women of Jerusalem
 Jesus falls for the third time
 Jesus stripped of his garments
 Jesus nailed to the Cross
 Jesus dies on the Cross
 Jesus' body is taken down of the cross
 Jesus laid in the sepulcher
 The discovery of the Holy Cross

References

Verkiai
Landmarks in Vilnius
Christianity in Vilnius
Catholic pilgrimage sites